Asian Network of Major Cities 21 was a body representing the interests of several of Asia's largest capital cities around common themes of importance, including urban planning, sustainability and crisis management. The organization was advocated by then Tokyo Governor Shintaro Ishihara (1999-2012) and formed by common declaration of those attending a meeting held in Kuala Lumpur in August 2000.  Following a review by member cities in 2014, the network was suspended and projects continued under new regional initiatives by Tokyo.

Joint projects
Industry
Promotion of Development of a small to medium-sized Jet Passenger Plane
“Welcome to Asia” Campaign
Promotion of Asian Business and Investment Projects
ICT Initiatives for Urban Development
Development of Affordable, Safe and Fast Mass Housing Technology Project
Environment
Urban and Global Environment Problems
Civil management
Network for Crisis Management
Health
Countermeasures to Combat Infectious Diseases in Asia
Arts and culture
Asian Performing Arts Festival
Women's Social participation
Women's Participation in Society
Human resource development
Youth-to-Youth Program -Creating Enterprising Originals
Staff Capacity Enhancement Program

Plenary Meeting
 The First Plenary Meeting (October 2001) - Tokyo
 The Second Plenary Meeting (November 2002) - Delhi
 The Third Plenary Meeting (November 2003) - Hanoi
 The Fourth Plenary Meeting (November 2004) - Jakarta
 The Fifth Plenary Meeting (April 2006) - Taipei
 The Sixth Plenary Meeting (November 2007) - Manila
 The Seventh Plenary Meeting (November 2008) - Kuala Lumpur
 The Eighth Plenary Meeting (November 2009) - Bangkok
 The Ninth Plenary Meeting (November 2010) - Tokyo
 The Tenth Plenary Meeting (October 2011) - Seoul
 The Eleventh Plenary Meeting (June 2012) - Singapore
 The Twelfth Plenary Meeting (November 2013) - Hanoi
 The Thirteenth Plenary Meeting (September 2014) - Tomsk

References

External links
 Official site (English version)
 Official site of fifth plenary (English)

International conferences
International organizations based in Asia
Lists of cities in Asia
International organizations based in Japan
Organizations established in 2000